Fetchin Bones was a cross-genre rock band from North Carolina. During a six-year career they produced five albums but were most celebrated for inspired live performances. One reviewer stated they were "a band that must be seen live for a full grasp of their eclectic frenzy". During numerous tours Fetchin Bones supported acts such as R.E.M., the B52s, X and the Red Hot Chili Peppers. Allmusic described the band as "a truly underrated group that didn't hit it big when they should've".

Musical style
The band mixed blues, punk and country music, and Hope Nicholls' "powerhouse" vocals were compared to Janis Joplin's in their "dirty intensity".  In a 1985 Whistle Test interview with Andy Kershaw, Nicholls said her influences include British bands Siouxsie and the Banshees and the Cocteau Twins.

Fetchin Bones' second through fourth albums were produced by Don Dixon and recorded at Mitch Easter's Drive-In Studio and at Reflection Studios in Charlotte. The fifth and final album was produced by Ed Stasium in Los Angeles.

The band had pioneered a kind of grunge rock. However this style did not yield commercial success.

Discography
Studio albums
Cabin Flounder (1985, DB)
Bad Pumpkin (1986, Capitol)
Galaxy 500 (1987, Capitol)
Monster (1989, Capitol)

Live albums
Dead Band Rockin' (2007, Audible Attraction)

Singles
"Super Freak" (1988, Capitol)
"Love Crushing" (1989, Capitol) (Modern Rock Tracks #19)

External links
The band's Facebook Site
Link to their MySpace site

References

Musical groups from North Carolina
Rock music groups from North Carolina